Indocentrism is any ethnocentric perspective that regards India to be central or unique relative to other countries and holds that the "host" culture i.e. of India, is superior to others.

Viewpoint 
According to Indologist Michael Witzel, there is a recent tendency of indigenously minded historical revisionism and rewriting of India's history and archaeology in scholarly publications, media, the Internet and government publications. This Indocentric rewriting includes claims that the first human civilization in the world formed in India in c. 10,000 BC, that there is an uninterrupted continuity of the Indian civilization from 7500 BC to present, and that Indo-European speaking Europe was populated by the immigrant people from the Indo-Gangetic Plain.

Responses of other countries

Sri Lanka
Much of Sri Lanka's early history has been described as having an Indocentric bias. This Indocentric bias in understanding Sri Lankan history led to a trend of Sri Lankan historians breaking away from the Indocentric bias in Sri Lankan history and instead focusing on Sri Lanka's historical and cultural links with Southeast Asia, which the country had close ties to. One of the most famous historians to break the Indocentric view of Sri Lankan history was Senarath Paranavithana who focused on Sri Lanka's connection with the Malay Peninsula and the rest of the Malay Archipelago. He established the "Malaya theory", claiming Sri Lanka's history with Kalinga was with the Kalingga Kingdom of Central Java, Indonesia and not with the Kalinga kingdom of eastern India.

See also
Indian nationalism

References

Geocultural perspectives
Ethnocentrism
Society of India
Indosphere